Retinoic acid receptor beta (RAR-beta), also known as NR1B2 (nuclear receptor subfamily 1, group B, member 2) is a nuclear receptor that in humans is encoded by the RARB gene.

Function 

This gene encodes retinoic acid receptor beta, a member of the thyroid-steroid hormone receptor superfamily of nuclear transcriptional regulators. This receptor localizes to the cytoplasm and to subnuclear compartments. It binds retinoic acid, the biologically active form of vitamin A which mediates cellular signalling in embryonic morphogenesis, cell growth and differentiation. It is thought that this protein limits growth of many cell types by regulating gene expression. The gene was first identified in a hepatocellular carcinoma where it flanks a hepatitis B virus integration site. A deregulation of this gene has also been detected in uterine cervical carcinoma preneoplastic lesions. The gene expresses at least two transcript variants; one additional transcript has been described, but its full length nature has not been determined.

Epigenetics 

The Retinoic acid receptor beta aberrant promoter DNA hypermethylation has been observed associated with cancer onset/progression. Indeed, this improper epigenetic phenomenon has been observed in women affected by Vulvar Squamous cell carcinoma arose from vulver lichen sclerosus. Methylation of the Retinoic acid receptor beta promoter may be a marker of cancer risk in patients affected by this disease.

Interactions 

Retinoic acid receptor beta has been shown to interact with NR4A2.

See also 
 Retinoic acid receptor

References

Further reading 

 
 
 
 
 
 
 
 
 
 
 
 
 
 
 
 
 
 

Intracellular receptors
Transcription factors